Golden Circle is a subsidiary of US-based Kraft Heinz, based in Brisbane, Queensland. Its main operations are food processing. Golden Circle was inducted into the Queensland Business Leaders Hall of Fame in 2010, for its significant contribution to the economy of Queensland through the processing of food products, notably fruit and vegetables.

Beginnings 

Golden Circle began operations in 1947 after construction of the main canning factory at Northgate was completed. The new facility was opened on 28 October 1947 by the then Premier of Queensland, the Hon Edward Hanlon in the presence of 1500 people including 500 Sunshine Coast fruit growers who arrived on a special train. The company was originally called 'Queensland Tropical Fruit Products', with 'Golden Circle' used as their brand name. Golden Circle was initially part of the Committee of Direction of Fruit Marketing in Queensland (COD). In 1964, under the leadership of Bernard Flewell-Smith and Percival Savage, the cannery was established as a separate business. It was split off from the COD by an amendment to the Fruit Marketing Organisation Acts.

Initially, the company processed and canned pineapples and produced fruit jams. Over the years, production has expanded to include other canned fruit and vegetables, fruit cordials, juices, carbonated beverages and baby food.

As of 2009, Golden Circle (GC) ceased to be an Australian Owned Company. The board and shareholders of GC agreed and sold all of their shares for 313% more than they were trading at prior to the offer from US Corporation, Heinz.

Golden Circle was one of few remaining Australian Food Companies being sold by Australian farmers to International Companies.

Operations 
Australian farmers supply more than 180,000 tonnes of fruit and vegetables annually to the company for processing. The fruit crops, of which pineapple is the largest, come from the Sunshine Coast hinterland, Maryborough, Woodbury, and northern Queensland. Vegetables are largely sourced from the Lockyer Valley west of Brisbane. Crops that are not grown in Queensland are supplied from interstate.

Golden Circle operates an A$20m food hall enabling a move into the development of new products such as baby food and a Tetra Pak plant that produces more than 42 million litres of fruit juices and drinks annually.

Golden Circle employs a large number of people, which varies seasonally between 700 and 1,700.

In addition to its main processing operation in Brisbane, Golden Circle also owns the Original Juice Co. plant at Mill Park, on Melbourne's northern outskirts, and a fresh fruit packing operation in Griffith, New South Wales.

Products 
Golden Circle manufactures more than 800 products including shelf stable fruit and vegetables (in cans and glass jars), fruit juices, cordials, soft drinks, jams, conserves and baby food. Pineapple products now account for only 24% of the company's total product range.

Presence 
 
The main production facility is at Northgate, a northern suburb of Brisbane.

Sales offices are located in every Australian state as well as New Zealand. Australia is the principal market for Golden Circle products, but they are also exported to New Zealand and other Pacific countries.

The company has factory outlets in Capalaba to the east of Brisbane and in Morayfield to the north of Brisbane.

Takeover bids 

On 26 September 2007, Coca-Cola Amatil announced it was making a conditional takeover bid for 100% of the companies shares.

On 6 October 2008, Heinz launched a Golden Circle takeover bid. Phillip Cave advised that the take over bid of $1.65 per share ($288 million in total) was "attractive" for all shareholders, particularly given the current difficult economic conditions.

The Heinz takeover bid was finalised successfully on 19 December 2008.

Production changes & job loss 
In May 2011 Golden Circle announced it would move beetroot production offshore to New Zealand affecting 160 Golden Circle jobs at the Northgate Plant. HEINZ Australia said it would instead invest more than $20 million at Northgate to upgrade its beverage manufacturing facilities.

See also

List of juices

References

External links
 

Food and drink companies of Australia
Manufacturing companies based in Brisbane
Drink companies of Australia
Australian jam and preserved fruit makers
Food and drink companies established in 1946
Heinz brands
Australian companies established in 1946
Juice brands